The 2009 Peace Cup Andalucia was an invitational friendly football tournament. It was the fourth edition of Peace Cup and was held in Spain from 24 July to 2 August in the cities of Madrid, Seville, Málaga, Jerez and Huelva. It was the first time that the tournament has been hosted by a nation other than South Korea. The winners of the tournament were Aston Villa, who defeated Juventus in the final. They succeeded Olympique Lyonnais, who were the previous holders of the tournament through winning the 2007 edition. It was one of seven 2009 pre-season friendly tournaments, the others being the Emirates Cup, the Barclays Asia Trophy, the World Football Challenge, the Wembley Cup, the Amsterdam Tournament and the Audi Cup.

Host and Venues

Host country
After the previous three tournaments were held in South Korea, the Peace Cup Committee decided that the tournament would be hosted by another country. In 2007, the Peace Cup organizers were connected with Sports Ministry of Andalucia and Andalucia Football Federation, after the discussion with the Autonomous Community of Andalucia, they suggested the cities of Seville, Málaga, Huelva and Jerez to host the 2009 Peace Cup.

On 19 December 2007, it was announced in a press conference in Seville that the number of teams would be increased to 12. It was also confirmed that Real Madrid and Sevilla would be playing in the tournament. The Peace Cup committee continued to negotiate with other "big" clubs, by 13 April 2009, eight more participating clubs such as Juventus, Málaga, Lyon, Aston Villa, Celtic, Porto, Fenerbahçe and LDU Quito, were announced. Celtic and Fenerbahçe, however, were forced to pull out due to conflicts with UEFA Champions League qualifying ties; they were replaced by Atlante and Beşiktaş, respectively.

Venues 
The official venue for the tournament was Andalucia, however some matches were played in Madrid.

Teams
The following 12 teams confirmed to play in the tournament.

Details

Format 
The 12 teams were divided into four groups of three teams. Each team played one match against each other in the group stage, the first place in each group qualified to the semi-finals and the winners advanced to the final.

Prize 
The champion and the runner-up received trophies as well as the corresponding cash prizes. The prizes were:

 Champion = €2,000,000
 Runner-up = €1,000,000
 Third and Fourth places = €500,000

Competition notes 
Several players scored their first goals for new clubs in the 2009 Peace Cup competition, though these goals do not impact their regular season statistics. These players included Cristiano Ronaldo scoring his first goal for Real Madrid, Diego scored his first goal for Juventus in the Peace Cup, and Marc Albrighton scored his first goal for Aston Villa in the Peace Cup. Aston Villa's Stiliyan Petrov suffered a dislocated shoulder in the competition's group stages that forced him to miss significant time with injury.

Matches 
All times are Central European Summer Time (UTC+2)

The final draw for the 2009 Peace Cup was staged in Seville on 16 April 2009.

Group stage 
The first place (shaded in green) qualified to the semi-finals.

Group A

Group B

Group C

Group D

Knockout stage

Semi-finals

Final

Scorers
Brazilian striker Hulk of Porto was the tournament's top scorer with three goals.

3 goals
  Hulk (Porto)

2 goals
  Vincenzo Iaquinta (Juventus)
  Cristiano Ronaldo (Real Madrid)
  Enrique Vera (LDU Quito)

1 goal
  Saud Kariri (Al-Ittihad)
  Hicham Aboucherouane (Al-Ittihad)
  Marc Albrighton (Aston Villa)
  John Carew (Aston Villa)
  Ashley Young (Aston Villa)
  Emile Heskey (Aston Villa)
  Steve Sidwell (Aston Villa)
  Gabriel Pereyra (Atlante)
  Rafael Márquez Lugo (Atlante)
  Christian Bermúdez (Atlante)
  Mert Nobre (Beşiktaş)

1 goal (cont.)
  Amauri (Juventus)
  Diego (Juventus)
  Nicola Legrottaglie (Juventus)
  Hasan Salihamidžić (Juventus)
  Fabio Cannavaro (Juventus)
  Néicer Reasco (LDU Quito)
  Paúl Ambrosi (LDU Quito)
  Claudio Graf (LDU Quito)
  Kim Källström (Lyon)
  Fernando (Málaga)
  José Juan Luque (Málaga)
  Raúl (Real Madrid)
  Guti (Real Madrid)
  Christoph Metzelder (Real Madrid)
  Álvaro Negredo (Real Madrid)
  Sébastien Squillaci (Sevilla)

Own goal
  Curtis Davies (Aston Villa) for (Atlante)

Broadcasting rights 
The following broadcasting systems had the rights for the broadcast of 2009 Peace Cup:

 La Sexta (all matches)

        ESPN (all matches)

 SBS (all matches)

 GOL TV

 SporTV

 Sport TV (all matches)

 La7 (semifinals and final)

 Teleamazonas (LDU Quito games, Semifinal and Final)

References

External links 
Official site
Peace Cup on Goal.com - Home
Peace Cup on goalzz.com

2009 in association football
2009
2009
2009–10 in Spanish football